The Sidi Darghut Mosque or Jama Sidi Darghut is a mosque in Tripoli, Libya. It was built in around 1560 by Dragut on the site of a Hospitaller church, parts of which were incorporated into the mosque. The mosque was damaged in World War II but it was subsequently repaired, although the reconstruction was not completely faithful to its original design.

History

The Sidi Darghut Mosque was built around 1560 by the Ottoman governor Dragut, shortly after the 1551 recapture of Tripoli from the Knights Hospitaller. The site of the mosque was formerly occupied by the Hospitaller church or chapel. The church had survived the 1551 siege, and Dragut personally chose this site to build his mosque. According to local tradition, the church building was retained intact and incorporated into the mosque. After Dragut was killed whilst attacking the Hospitallers in the Great Siege of Malta in 1565, his body was taken to Tripoli and buried in the mosque.

A number of alterations were carried out to the mosque by Iskander Pasha in the early 1600s, including the remodelling of the minaret and the construction of a hammam (or at least the renovation of an existing one).

The Superintendence of Monuments and Excavations made an accurate survey of the site in 1921. The building was restored in the 1920s, but it was hit by bombardment in World War II and the central part of the building (which had been the church) was severely damaged. Reconstruction works were undertaken by Ali Mohamed Abu Zaian, but the rebuilt mosque contains a number of differences from the original building.

Armed men attempted to vandalise the mosque several times during the 2014 violence in Libya but were repelled.

Architecture
The Sidi Darghut Mosque was the first Ottoman style mosque to be built in Tripoli. The building has a T-shaped prayer hall, with a plan bearing some similarities to mosques found in Anatolia. The Hospitaller church was a small rectangular building with timber beams supporting a flat roof, and when it was converted into a mosque new wings were added on either side of the original building. The mosque is set within a trapezoidal enclosure which includes other facilities including a cemetery.

The prayer hall has a roof which originally consisted of 27 small cupolas (32 after the postwar reconstruction). This element is typical of traditional Libyan architecture, and it later became a common element in mosques built in the area. The mosque includes two mihrabs, and a number of tombs including that of Dragut and his family are found near one of them. The mosque also includes a fountain for ablution (known as a midha) and a minaret which was remodelled by Iskander Pasha in 1602.

References

External links

Mosques in Tripoli, Libya
Mosques converted from churches in the Ottoman Empire
Mosques completed in 1560
Ottoman mosques in Libya
Church buildings of the Knights Hospitaller
Former Roman Catholic churches in Libya